The 2022–23 Sport Lisboa e Benfica season is the club's 119th season in existence and its 89th consecutive season in the top flight of Portuguese football. It started on 2 August 2022, with the third qualifying round of the UEFA Champions League, where Benfica qualified for the group stage, and will conclude in May or June 2023. Domestically, Benfica currently play in the Primeira Liga, having been eliminated from the Taça da Liga and Taça de Portugal.

Players

First-team squad

Transfers

In

Out

Pre-season and friendlies

The pre-season began on 25 June and ended on 27 July 2022.

Competitions

Overall record

Primeira Liga

League table

Results summary

Results by round

Matches
The league fixtures were announced on 5 July 2022.

Taça de Portugal

Taça da Liga

Group stage

UEFA Champions League

Third qualifying round
The draw for the third qualifying round was held on 18 July 2022.

Play-off round
The draw for the play-off round was held on 2 August 2022.

Group stage 

The group stage draw was held on 25 August 2022.

Knockout phase

Round of 16
The draw for the round of 16 was held on 7 November 2022.

Quarter-finals
The draw for the quarter-finals was held on 17 March 2023.

Statistics

Appearances and goals

|-
! colspan=18 style=background:#dcdcdc; text-align:center|Goalkeepers

|-
! colspan=18 style=background:#dcdcdc; text-align:center|Defenders

|-
! colspan=18 style=background:#dcdcdc; text-align:center|Midfielders

|-
! colspan=18 style=background:#dcdcdc; text-align:center|Forwards

|-
! colspan=18 style=background:#dcdcdc; text-align:center|Players who made an appearance and/or had a squad number but left the team.

|}

References

S.L. Benfica seasons
Benfica
Benfica